William Henry Brett (1895 – April 30, 1972) was a fisherman and political figure in British Columbia. He represented Prince Rupert in the Legislative Assembly of British Columbia from 1945 to 1949 as a Co-operative Commonwealth Federation member.

He was born in Fogo, Newfoundland. Brett joined the Royal Navy Reserve at the start of World War I and served overseas. After the war, he settled in Prince Rupert, British Columbia, where he was involved in deep sea fishing. Brett was president of the Deep Sea Fisherman's Union local and of the Prince Rupert Fisherman's Credit Union. He later served as general manager of the Fisherman's Co-operative. Brett served three years on Prince Rupert city council. He defeated former premier Thomas Dufferin Pattullo to win his seat in the assembly in 1945. Brett was defeated by John Duncan McRae when he ran for reelection in 1949. He died in Prince Rupert at the age of 76.

References 

1895 births
1972 deaths
People from Fogo Island, Newfoundland and Labrador
Newfoundland Colony people
British Columbia Co-operative Commonwealth Federation MLAs
20th-century Canadian legislators